= Merritt N. Cootes =

American diplomat

- Born: March 11, 1909; Virginia, United States
- Died: November 26, 1998
- Education: Princeton University (Class of 1931)
- Occupation: Diplomat
- Spouse: Jean Phillips Cootes

Merritt N. Cootes (March 11, 1909 – November 26, 1998) was an American career diplomat who served in multiple international postings for the United States Foreign Service between the 1930s and the 1960s.

== Early life and education ==
Cootes was born in Virginia in 1909. He was educated in France and Austria before attending Princeton University, from which he graduated in 1931.

== Diplomatic career ==
Cootes joined the U.S. Foreign Service in 1932, following his success in the entry examination the previous year. His first posting was as a junior officer at the U.S. Legation in Port-au-Prince, Haiti. Over the course of his career, he held assignments in Hong Kong, Saigon, Lisbon, Rome, Moscow, Lahore, and again in Port-au-Prince.

In Washington, he held roles such as Officer in Charge of Public Affairs in the Office of Western European Affairs and Officer in Charge of Swiss-Benelux Affairs at the U.S. Department of State.

He retired from the Foreign Service in 1969.

== Personal life ==
Cootes was married to Jean Phillips Cootes for 51 years. After retirement, the couple lived in Florence, Italy, before returning to the United States in 1986, where they settled near Princeton University.

== Death ==
Merritt N. Cootes died on November 26, 1998, after a long illness.
